Japan has eleven LCM 25 ton type landing ships in service with Japan Maritime Self-Defense Force. Built in Japan, the boats are similar in design to the US LCM-6 type and have similar capacity. Two larger 50 ton LCMs, built by Yokohama Yacht, were commissioned in March 2003.

Ships in the class
 YF 2075
 YF 2121
 YF 2124
 YF 2125
 YF 2127 - commissioned in March 1992
 YF 2128 - commissioned in March 1992
 YF 2129 - commissioned in March 1992
 YF 2132 - commissioned in March 1993
 YF 2135 - commissioned in March 1995
 YF 2138 - commissioned in March 1996
 YF 2141 - commissioned in March 1997

LCM
Landing craft